Jacob Zekveld (1945–2002) was a Dutch sculptor, graphic artist, painter, designer, and installation artist.

He studied at the Free Academy in The Hague.

The topics of Zekveld were focused on people, animals and fairytale scenes. His style attribute belongs to the nouvelle figuration. From Zekveld has a number of awards and grants awarded including a scholarship and the Royal Subsidy for Painting in 1968, and in 1969.

Some of his works are:
 Dans mes yeux
 Jacob in Spiegelland
 The undertakers and the angry one

Exhibitions and prizes

Royal Subsidy for Painting, 1967
Royal Subsidy for Painting, 1968
Europe Prize for Painting of the city of Ostend silver medal, 1971
Work Exhibition Visual Arts, 1989

References

1945 births
2002 deaths
Dutch artists
Artists from Rotterdam